Progress Live is the twelfth album released by British pop band Take That. It is also the band's second live album to date and was released as a double disc album in Europe on 21 November 2011 and in the UK on 28 November 2011. The album was recorded during their Progress Live tour at Wembley Stadium in London and Etihad Stadium in Manchester in June and July 2011.

Promotion
To promote the release of Progress Live on home media and CD, Take That released a music video of their track "Eight Letters" which featured as the closing track on the album Progress and the final song they performed on the setlist of Progress Live. The music video shows highlights of the shows, including behind the scenes footage and the band performing and greeting the fans at the finale. The camera then pans away from Take That as they leave the stage, before receding further to reveal the stage set with the 60 ft mechanical man as it stands arms wide and its heart beating, standing out against the night sky. The song was also released to radio, where it was playlisted by Radio 2 on its first week of radio airplay.

Track listing

Notes
"Eight Letters" samples "Vienna" as performed by Ultravox and written by Midge Ure, Chris Cross, Warren Cann and Billy Currie.
"When They Were Young" Medley consists of "A Million Love Songs" and "Babe", which were written by Gary Barlow, and "Everything Changes", which was written by Barlow, Michael Ward, Eliot Kennedy, Cary Bayliss.

Charts

Weekly charts

Year-end charts

Certifications

Release history

References

Take That albums
2011 live albums
Live albums recorded at Wembley Stadium